Irish heath is a common name for two closely related species of flowering plants in the heather family Ericaceae:

Daboecia cantabrica
Erica erigena